OpenView is a free-to-view direct broadcast satellite television provider in South Africa which is run by Platco Digital (part of the eMedia Group which includes free-to-air channel e.tv). It launched on 15 October 2013.

In addition to the "e" suite of networks, OpenView also carries the SABC networks, along with several domestic and international channels. It also carries nearly thirty audio-only radio stations.

As of 2021, OpenView is available in 2.5 million households.

Channel List
SABC 1

SABC 2

SABC 3

e.tv

eExtra

People's Weather

France24

eXposed

ePlesier

The Home Channel+

SA Music

SABC Sport

Mindset

DBE TV

eMovies

eMovies Extra

eToonz

Star Life 

ZeeOne

Glow TV

19 SABC Radio Stations

9 Privately Owned Radio Stations

History
The sister company of e.tv, Platco Digital, launched the Openview HD platform on 16 October 2013. The product came to the market during a time where South Africa's transition to digital terrestrial television was slowed down both due to political and corporate gridlock. In 2018, the system became known simply as OpenView.

See also
e.tv
List of South African media

References

Mass media in South Africa